Events in the year 1945 in Portugal.

Incumbents
President: Óscar Carmona 
Prime Minister: António de Oliveira Salazar

Events
 Disestablishment of the Movement of National Antifascist Unity
 14 March - Establishment of TAP Portugal
 October - Establishment of the Movement of Democratic Unity
 18 November - Legislative election
 Establishment of Caritas Portugal

Culture
 29 January - Establishment of A Bola

Films
Três Dias Sem Deus

Sport
In association football, for the first-tier league seasons, see 1944–45 Primeira Divisão and 1945–46 Primeira Divisão; for the Taça de Portugal seasons, see 1944–45 Taça de Portugal and 1945–46 Taça de Portugal. 
 1 July - 1945 Taça de Portugal Final
 Establishment of C.A. Valdevez
 Establishment of  FC Amares

References

 
Portugal
Years of the 20th century in Portugal
Portugal